Ajayi Adeyinka Ayantunji is a Nigerian politician who is a member of the House of Representatives of Nigeria. He represents the Odo-Otin/Ifelodun/Boripe constituency.

References 

Living people
21st-century Nigerian politicians
All Progressives Congress politicians
Year of birth missing (living people)